The Church of Saint Charles Borromeo is a Roman Catholic parish church in San Carlos, Uruguay.

The San Carlos Borromeo church is one of the oldest religious buildings in the country, dating back to colonial times; The parish was established 1 February 1763.

References

External links

1763 establishments in Uruguay

Roman Catholic church buildings in Maldonado Department
San Carlos, Uruguay